Günter Lyhs (born 20 April 1934) is a German former gymnast. He competed at the 1960 and 1964 Summer Olympics in all artistic gymnastics events and finished in seventh and third place, with the German team, respectively. Individually his best achievement was 16th place on the vault in 1964.

References

1934 births
Living people
German male artistic gymnasts
Olympic gymnasts of the United Team of Germany
Gymnasts at the 1960 Summer Olympics
Gymnasts at the 1964 Summer Olympics
Olympic bronze medalists for the United Team of Germany
Olympic medalists in gymnastics
People from East Prussia
People from Giżycko County
Sportspeople from Warmian-Masurian Voivodeship
Medalists at the 1964 Summer Olympics
20th-century German people
21st-century German people